Aleksandr Valeryevich Golubev (born 27 February 1986) is a former Russian professional football player.

Club career
He played two seasons in the Russian Football National League for FC Volgar-Gazprom Astrakhan and FC Metallurg-Kuzbass Novokuznetsk.

External links
 
 

1986 births
Sportspeople from Astrakhan
Living people
Russian footballers
Association football forwards
FC Volgar Astrakhan players
FC Novokuznetsk players
FC Gandzasar Kapan players
Armenian Premier League players
Russian expatriate footballers
Expatriate footballers in Armenia